"Living Dead Girl" is the second single from Rob Zombie's solo debut album Hellbilly Deluxe. 
The line, "Who is this irresistible creature who has an insatiable love for the dead?" in the beginning of the song is from the trailer of the film Lady Frankenstein. The music in the beginning of the song is taken from the trailer of the Wes Craven film, The Last House on the Left. The spoken words "What are you thinking about?/The same thing you are" at the beginning of the verses are taken from the 1971 film Daughters of Darkness (a dialogue between the characters played by Delphine Seyrig and Andrea Rau).  In this song, Zombie sings, "Goldfoot's machine creates another fiend so beautiful they make you kill". This relates to the villain played by Vincent Price in the 1965 film Dr. Goldfoot and the Bikini Machine and the 1966 film Dr. Goldfoot and the Girl Bombs. Also, he sings "Operation Filth they love to love the wealth of an SS making scary sounds." This is possibly a reference to the notorious 1974 film Ilsa: She-Wolf of the SS.

The song also appears on Rob Zombie's Past, Present & Future, the greatest hits album The Best of Rob Zombie, and remixes are contained on American Made Music to Strip By in 2001 and another one on Mondo Sex Head produced by Photek in 2012. The original mix was featured in both Bride of Chucky and Gus Van Sant's 1998 Psycho remake, appearing on the album of the latter, the "Naked Exorcism Remix" appeared on The Crow: Salvation Soundtrack in 2000. The song was covered by Sinus Giddy for The Electro-Industrial Tribute to Rob Zombie in 2002. Also a version of the song is played in a club in the TV show Angel, while the character Faith tears apart a dance club. The sleeve for the CD single features an image of Rob Zombie's wife, Sheri Moon.The song was featured in the trailer for the 2007 film Catacombs.

A trance remix of the song also featured on the English trailer for the film Day Watch in late 2007.

Music video
The music video for "Living Dead Girl" derives its imagery from Robert Wiene's 1920 silent film, The Cabinet of Dr. Caligari, with Zombie in the role of The Doctor (played by Werner Krauss in the original film) and Sheri Moon in the place of The Living Dead Girl, whose appearance is inspired from the character White Zombie from White Zombie (in the original film a somnambulist named Cesare played by Conrad Veidt).  The video imitates the appearance of aged, silent films, using intertitles and artificially grainy and herky-jerky images.  Like Caligari, it also uses black and white film that has been tinted sepia, aqua and violet for Expressionistic effect. The video was directed by both Joseph Kahn and Rob Zombie.

Personnel
 Tom Baker - Mastering
 Paul DeCarli - Additional Programming
 Frank Gyner - Additional Engineering
 Scott Humphrey - Producer, Engineer, Mixing, Programming
 Chris Lord-Alge - Additional Mixing
 Blasko - Bass
 Riggs - Guitar
 Tempesta - Drums
 Rob Zombie - Vocals, Lyrics, Artwork
 Sheri Moon Zombie - Living Dead Girl

Charts

References

Rob Zombie songs
1998 singles
Music videos directed by Joseph Kahn
Songs written by Scott Humphrey
Songs written by Rob Zombie
Black-and-white music videos
1998 songs
Geffen Records singles
Songs about death